The Derry Junior Football Championship (known for sponsorship reasons as the Premier Electrics Derry Junior Football Championship) is an annual Gaelic football competition contested by lower-tier Derry clubs.

The competition receives coverage in the national media.

Craigbane are the title holders (2022) defeating Ballerin in the Final.

History
It was once (around 2011) The Derry Credit Union Derry Junior Football Championship for sponsorship reasons but no more. It had, by 2015 at the latest, become the Premier Electrics Derry Junior Football Championship.

2018 champions Limavady faced losing Callum Brown to the Australian Football League (AFL), the professional Australian rules football competition.

In 2022, Craigbane bridged an eleven-year gap to win.

The final has been played at Celtic Park and at Owenbeg.

Honours
The trophy presented to the winners is the ? The winners of the Derry Junior Football Championship qualify to represent their county in the Ulster Junior Club Football Championship. They often do well there, with the likes of Limavady (2018), Faughanvale (2015), Lissan (2008), Limavady (2003) and Ballerin (2002) among the clubs from Derry to play in at least one Ulster Championship final after winning the Derry Junior Football Championship. The winners can, in turn, go on to play in the All-Ireland Junior Club Football Championship.

List of finals

Wins listed by club

References

3